Siliwangi University (Indonesian: Universitas Siliwangi, abbreviated as UNSIL) is a public university in Tasikmalaya, West Java. The name of the university is derived from a royal figure in Sunda Kingdom, King Siliwangi of Pajajaran.

History 
Before UNSIL was founded, the Educational Supervision and Administration Academy (Indonesian: Akademi Administrasi dan Supervisi Pendidikan, abbreviated as ADSUP) was established in its place in 1977. It was originally a branch of Padjajaran University’s Faculty of Social and Political Sciences that went defunct due to a government regulation at the time. By 1978, ADSUP underwent a restructuring and became UNSIL. UNSIL officially started operating as a private university in 1980 and offered courses that now become a part of the Faculty of Teaching and Education Science as well as the Faculty of Economics. In 2014, due to a presidential decree signed by Susilo Bambang Yudhoyono, UNSIL became a public university.

Academics

Faculties 
UNSIL consists of seven faculties and 23 undergraduate programs, as well as three postgraduate programs.

Faculty of Teaching and Education Science 

 Mathematics Education
 History Education
 Economics Education
 Biology Education
 Geography Education
 English Education
 Indonesian Language and Literature Education
 Physics Education
 Sports Education
 Informal Education

Faculty of Economics 

 Accounting
 Management
 Development Economics
 Finance and Banking (available as an associate’s degree)

Faculty of Engineering 

 Electrical Engineering
 Informatics Engineering
 Civil Engineering

Faculty of Agriculture 

 Agrobusiness
 Agrotechnology

Faculty of Islamic Religion 

 Sharia Economics

Faculty of Health 

 Public Health
 Nutrition

Faculty of Social and Political Science 

 Political Science

Faculty of Postgraduate Studies 

 Agrobusiness
 Management
 Demographics and Environment Education

Ranking 
According to Webometrics’ 2021 report, Siliwangi University is ranked 299th from all universities in Indonesia.

According to 4icu (uniRank) 2021 report, Siliwangi University is ranked 19th from 56th Universities in West Java, Ranked 130th from 576 Universities in Indonesia.

References 

Indonesian state universities
Universities in Indonesia